Joseph Panny (23 October 1794 – 7 September 1838) was an Austrian composer and violinist who lived primarily in Vienna. A contemporary and friend of Ludwig van Beethoven, very few of his works remain in the active repertoire today.

Compositions 
He was the composer of one of the second-published set of Diabelli Variations, alongside Franz Schubert, Carl Czerny, a young Franz Liszt, and many other Austrian composers. While in Vienna, Niccolò Paganini commissioned Joseph Panny, fellow violinist and composer, to write the "Tempest" on 25 May 1828 (it was finished on 14 June), while supervising himself the composition.

See also 
 Ludlamshöhle

References 
 Ekard Stark: Joseph Panny: (1794–1838); ein Beitrag zur Mainzer Musikgeschichte des frühen 19. Jahrhunderts, Zulassungsarbeit zum Staatsexamen für das Lehramt an höheren Schulen, Mainz, 1961.
 
 Peter Erhart: Niederösterreichische Komponisten. Doblinger, Wien 1998, p. 51.

External links 
 
 
 

1794 births
1838 deaths
19th-century Austrian people
19th-century classical composers
Austrian classical composers
Musicians from Vienna
German Romantic composers
German male classical composers
19th-century German composers
19th-century German male musicians